Illinois County, Virginia, was a political and geographic region, part of the British Province of Quebec, claimed during the American Revolutionary War on July 4, 1778, by George Rogers Clark of the Virginia Militia as a result of the Illinois Campaign. Though part or all of the area was also claimed by Connecticut, Massachusetts, and Virginia, it was formally organized by the Commonwealth of Virginia later that year. The County was accorded official governmental existence, including legally defined boundaries and a formal governmental structure under the laws of the Commonwealth. The county seat was the old Illinois Country French village of Kaskaskia. John Todd was appointed by Governor Patrick Henry to head the county's government.  The county was abolished in January 1782, and Virginia ceded the land to the new United States Confederation government in 1784. The area later became the Northwest Territory by an Act of Congress in 1787.

Geographically, the county was bordered to the southeast by the Ohio River, in the west by the Mississippi River, and in the north by the Great Lakes at the time of its existence. It included all of what were known as Ohio Country and eastern Illinois Country under French sovereignty.  Politically, its effective reach extended only to the old French settlements of Vincennes, Cahokia, and Kaskaskia.

See also 
 American Revolutionary War § Stalemate in the North. Places ' Illinois County, Virginia ' in overall sequence and strategic context.
 Former counties, cities, and towns of Virginia
 Overhill Cherokee
 Overmountain Men
 Trans-Appalachia

References

External links 
 Virginia County Maps and Atlases

Former counties of Virginia
Pre-statehood history of Ohio
Pre-statehood history of Illinois
Pre-statehood history of Indiana
Pre-statehood history of Michigan
Pre-statehood history of Wisconsin